Nafanga is a rural commune in the Cercle of Koutiala in the Sikasso Region of southern Mali. The commune covers an area of 274 square kilometers and includes 6 villages.

Dougouniona
Kani
Karangasso
Nintabougoro
Tianhirisso
Zéguésso

In the 2009 census it had a population of 9,273. The village of Karangasso, the administrative centre (chef-lieu) of the commune, is 26 km southeast of Koutiala.

References

External links
.

Communes of Sikasso Region